The Princess Diaries, Volume IV and 1/2: Project Princess is a young adult novel in the Princess Diaries series.  Written by Meg Cabot, it was released in 2003 by HarperCollins Publishers and is the first novella in the series.

Synopsis
Most princesses would prefer to spend their spring breaks in Gstaad, or some other equally unpronounceable European hot spot.

Not this one, though. Hammer in hand, Princess Mia embarks on an epic adventure for one so admittedly unhandy: along with her cohorts from school, she's off to build houses for the less fortunate. It doesn't take Mia long to realize that helping others—while an unimpeachably noble pastime—is very hard work. Will her giving spirit prevail? Will the house collapse due to royally clumsy construction? And most importantly, will Michael stop working long enough to kiss her?

Plot Summary
Mia Thermopolis and her friends Lilly Moscovitz, her brother Michael Moscovitz, Boris, and her teacher, Mrs. Martinez, go to West Virginia to help out the less fortunate. For three days, they volunteer with Helping the Homeless to build a house. They leave Manhattan for West Virginia with the supplies to go camping. Mia is not interested in the project, but Michael is going to volunteer with the group. At the end of the novel, a host family received the new house, and Grand-mère arrived at the end of the three days to bring the group back to Manhattan. 

2003 American novels
American young adult novels

American novellas
The Princess Diaries novels
HarperCollins books